Hjeltnes is a surname. Notable people with the surname include:

Arne Hjeltnes (born 1963), Norwegian writer, television personality, marketer and politician
Guri Hjeltnes (born 1953), Norwegian journalist and historian
Knut Hjeltnes (athlete) (born 1952), former athlete from Norway
Knut Hjeltnes (architect) (born 1961), Norwegian architect
Kristofer Kristofersson Hjeltnes (1856–1930), Norwegian horticulturist and politician
Kristofer Sjursson Hjeltnes (1730–1804), Norwegian farmer and businessperson

Norwegian-language surnames